Gerhard "Gerd" Friedrich (16 September 1917 – 16 March 1945) was a Luftwaffe fighter ace of World War II. He was one of night fighter ace scored 30 victories. All of his victories were recorded at night.

World War II
World War II in Europe began on Friday 1 September 1939 when German forces invaded Poland. Friedrich started his Luftwaffe career as a transport pilot with Kampfgruppe zur besonderen Verwendung 104 (KGr.z.b.v. 104—Fighting Group for Special Use) and participated in the invasion of Crete.

Night fighter operations

Following the 1939 aerial Battle of the Heligoland Bight, bombing missions by the Royal Air Force (RAF) shifted to the cover of darkness, initiating the Defence of the Reich campaign. By mid-1940, Generalmajor (Brigadier General) Josef Kammhuber had established a night air defense system dubbed the Kammhuber Line. It consisted of a series of control sectors equipped with radars and searchlights and an associated night fighter. Each sector, named a Himmelbett (canopy bed), would direct the night fighter into visual range with target bombers. In 1941, the Luftwaffe started equipping night fighters with airborne radar such as the Lichtenstein radar. This airborne radar did not come into general use until early 1942.

Friedrich received training as a night fighter pilot and began his night-fighting era when he was posted to III. Gruppe (3rd group) of Nachtjagdgeschwader 1 (NJG 1—1st Night Fighter Wing) at the beginning of 1942. Serving with II. Gruppe (2nd group) of Nachtjagdgeschwader 4 (NJG 4—4th Night Fighter Wing), he claimed his fourth victory on 24 October when he shot down the Handley Page Halifax bomber W1188 from No. 103 Squadron near Bar-le-Duc. 

He was appointed Staffelkapitän (squadron leader) of 10. Staffel (10th squadron) of NJG 4 on 1 January 1943. On 10/11 April, 502 RAF bombers attacked Frankfurt. In total, the RAF lost 22 aircraft, ten of which shot down by NJG 4, including a Wellington bomber claimed by Friedrich at 03:23.  On 16/17 April, during an attack of 327 bombers on Plzeň, Friedrich was shot down and wounded. He bailed out from his Messerschmitt Bf 110 and landed near Hochspeyer. 

On 1 August 1943, IV. Gruppe of NJG 4 became the I. Gruppe of Nachtjagdgeschwader 6 (NJG 6—6th Night Fighter Wing) and was based at Mainz-Finthen Airport. On 12 July 1944, he was appointed Gruppenkommandeur (group commander) of I. Gruppe of NJG 6. Friedrich was awarded the Knight's Cross of the Iron Cross on 15 March 1945.

The RAF targeted the Wintershall oil refineries at Lützkendorf, which lies east of Mücheln, with 244 Lancaster bombers and eleven de Havilland Mosquito fast bombers on the night of 14/15 March 1945. In defense of this attack, Friedrich claimed three Lancasters shot down in timeframe 23:15 and 23:24.

On the night of 16/17 March 1945, Friedrich collided with the Lancaster PB785 from No. 576 Squadron RAF, piloted by Flight Lieutenant Frank Edmund Dotten, near Stuttgart. Friedrich and his crew, Leutnant Lewerenz, Oberfeldwebel Giesen and Unteroffizier Meyer, were killed in their Junkers Ju 88 G-6 (Werknummer 621801—factory number) along with the seven crew members of the British bomber.

Summary of career

Aerial victory claims
According to Obermaier and Spick, Friedrich was credited with 30 nighttime—aerial victories, claimed in an unknown number of combat missions. Foreman, Parry and Mathews, authors of Luftwaffe Night Fighter Claims 1939 – 1945, researched the German Federal Archives and found records for 33 nocturnal victory claims. Mathews and Foreman also published Luftwaffe Aces – Biographies and Victory Claims, listing Friedrich with 32 claims, all of which on the Western Front.

Awards
 German Cross in Gold on 1 October 1944 as Hauptmann in the 1./Nachtjagdgeschwader 6
 Knight's Cross of the Iron Cross on 15 March 1945 as Major and Gruppenkommandeur of the I./Nachtjagdgeschwader 6

Notes

References

Citations

Bibliography

 
 
 
 
 
 
 
 
 
 

1917 births
1945 deaths
Luftwaffe pilots
German World War II flying aces
Luftwaffe personnel killed in World War II
Military personnel from Berlin
Recipients of the Gold German Cross
Recipients of the Knight's Cross of the Iron Cross